Gad Shimron (born 1950) is an Israeli journalist, author and military affairs commentator.

Biography 
Shimron was born in Tel Aviv. He is a graduate of the Hebrew University of Jerusalem in History and the study of Southeast Asia.

During the 1970s and 1980s, Shimron was a member of various operative units of the Mossad for ten years.

During the 1990s, Shimron served as the European correspondent for the Israeli daily newspaper Ma'ariv, worked as a journalist in the news department of Israel's public domestic and international radio service Kol Yisrael and presented the morning show on the Israeli Channel 1. Shimron continued to work for Ma'ariv until he was fired from the newspaper in 2008.

In addition, Shimron has published seven fiction and non-fiction books on intelligence, security and the history of the Crusaders, in Hebrew, English, French and German.

Between 1984 and 1991 Shimron was instrumental in the rescue of the Ethiopian Jews out of Sudan and Ethiopia by bringing them to Israel.

The script for The Red Sea Diving Resort, a 2019 spy thriller film, was loosely based ("inspired") on an actual undercover mission (part of Operation Brothers) that moved Ethiopian Jews to Israel. Most of the information about this operation was first revealed in Shimron’s book Mossad Exodus: The Daring Undercover Rescue of the Lost Jewish Tribe. As Time magazine points out, however, the film is not associated with the book. Shimron discussed the mission with journalists in 2019, and commented about the risks involved in an undercover operation in the Sudan. "So much happened: We were shot at; I was arrested and interrogated by Sudanese security. Thank goodness nobody was killed or seriously wounded, but the operations moving the immigrants were definitely dangerous."

Publications 
 
  - the book has been translated into French under the name "Mossad's secret hysteria."
  - The full story of the only Mossad operation which was aimed at eliminating a Nazi war criminal (Herberts Cukurs). Translated to English, German and Latvian.
  - the book focuses on the Mossad's covert operation which brought the Ethiopian Jews to Israel from Sudan. Translated into English under the name Mossad Exodus.
  - a historic novel based on the Crusader period in the region of Palestine.
  - a political thriller about the Israeli Prime Minister blackmailed by his wife.
  - the book focuses on Special forces in the armies of the world.
  - a historical novel based on a true story.

References

External links
 Interview with Gad Shimron on BBC World - published on 17 February 2010
 All of Gad Shimron's columns in Ma'ariv (Hebrew)
 

1950 births
Living people
Israeli Jews
Israeli journalists
Hebrew University of Jerusalem alumni
People from Tel Aviv